Nininger's Mill, also known as Tinker Mill, is a historic grist mill located near Daleville, Botetourt County, Virginia. The mill was built about 1847, and is a three-story, brick structure with a gable roof. Wood-frame additions added in the 20th century, are found on the north and east walls. Also on the property is a contributing simple one-story, wood-frame late 19th-century house. The mill was converted to a restaurant in 1980.

It was listed on the National Register of Historic Places in 1980.

References

Grinding mills on the National Register of Historic Places in Virginia
Industrial buildings completed in 1847
Buildings and structures in Botetourt County, Virginia
National Register of Historic Places in Botetourt County, Virginia
Grinding mills in Virginia
1847 establishments in Virginia